Hypographa is a genus of moths in the family Geometridae erected by Achille Guenée in 1857.

Species
Hypographa epiodes Turner, 1930
Hypographa aristarcha Prout, 1910
Hypographa phlegetonaria Guenée, 1857
Hypographa reflua Lucas, 1898

References

Oenochrominae